Momin or Mumin is an Arabic Islamic term, frequently referenced in the Quran, meaning "believer", and may refer to:

People named Momin
 Lokshahir Bashir Momin Kavathekar (born 1947), Indian poet and writer 
 Momin Khan Momin (1800–1851), Mughal-era poet
 Abdul Momin (1788–1885), 24th sultan of Brunei
 Abdul Momin Imambari (1930–2020), Bangladeshi Islamic scholar
 Numal Momin, Indian politician
 Friedrich von Frankenberg, also known as Sheikh Momin, early proponent of Sufism in Australia

Places
 Kot Momin, a town in the Sargodha district of Punjab, Pakistan
 Ghari Momin, a small village in the Rajouri district of Jammu and Kashmir, India

Groups
 Momin Ansari, a Muslim community, mainly in India, Pakistan, and Nepal

See also
 Mumin
 Momna, Nizari Ismailis from Gujarat, India
 Memon (disambiguation)

Arabic words and phrases
Urdu-language words and phrases
Bengali words and phrases